Fu Dingyi (12 December 1877 – 3 May 1958) was a Chinese educator and scholar.

He was a member of the 1st and 2nd National Committee of the Chinese People's Political Consultative Conference and a member of the 1st National People's Congress.

Names
His courtesy name was Yucheng and his art name was Hui'an.

Biography
Fu was born in Baiguo Town of Hengshan County, Hunan, on December 12, 1877, during the Qing Empire. He attended Hengyang Normal School. He was accepted to Imperial University of Peking (now Peking University) in 1903 and graduated in 1908, where he majored in English. After the Xinhai Revolution, he returned to Hunan, and served as President of Yuelu Academy and President of Hunan Provincial Education Association. He founded First High School of Changsha in Changsha in 1912, where Mao Zedong was educated. Fu was President of Hunan University from 1914 to 1915. In June 1926, he was appointed Vice-Minister of the Ministry of Finance of Beiyang Government, he resigned in March 1927. Fu went to Yan'an in June 1946 and joined the Communist Party Government. After the establishment of the People's Republic of China (PRC), he became the President of Central Research Institute of Culture and History. Fu died of pneumonia on May 3, 1958, in Beijing.

References

External links

1877 births
People from Hengshan County
1958 deaths
Educators from Hunan
Presidents of Hunan University
Imperial University of Peking alumni
Republic of China politicians from Hunan
People's Republic of China politicians from Hunan
Politicians from Hengyang